Lieutenant General Javed Ashraf Qazi, HI(M), SBt, (born 4 September 1941) is a Pakistani general and politician who is currently a Senator in the Parliament of Pakistan. During his army career, Qazi headed the ISI from 1993 to 1995 and Military Intelligence from 1990 to 1991. During his political career, he served as a cabinet minister under President-General Pervez Musharraf, first as Communications Minister (2000–2002) and then as Education Minister (2004–2007).

Military career
Qazi joined Pakistan Military Academy after graduating from Cadet College Hasan Abdal. He was commissioned in the Pakistan Army April 1962 in the 25th PMA Long Course in the Regiment of Artillery. He later rose in his career to be the DG Military Intelligence under General Mirza Aslam Beg in 1990. Promoted to Lieutenant General in 1992, Qazi served as Master-General of Ordnance (MGO) from 1992 to 1993. He was then brought in to head the ISI by General Abdul Waheed Kakar in May 1993. Gen Waheed mandated Qazi not only to cleanse the ISI of "Islamists" but to rein in the "Jehadis" in Kashmir. Qazi left the post in 1995 to assume the command of XXX Corps at Gujranwala. Qazi retired from the army in February 1996 thus relieving the corps.

Political career
Qazi started his political career after taking over as the Secretary of Science and Technology Division in 1996. He continued this post under Prime Minister Nawaz Sharif until 1997. He was later inducted as the Secretary of Railways in October 1999 by the new military leader General Pervez Musharraf, which he continued until 2000. Then he became the Minister of Communications and Railways in addition to Housing and Works from 2000 to 2002. He successfully fought the Senate seat in 2003, and became a senator on Pakistan Muslim League (Q) seat. The government later inducted him as Minister of Education in 2004 replacing Zubaida Jalal. His three-year stint ended in 2007, when the 5-year mandate for PML-Q government ended. He later was senator of PMLQ.

Controversies
During his tenure as Federal Education Minister in General Pervez Musharraf's cabinet, Mr. Qazi stirred up controversy when in a talk show he erroneously mentioned that Quran has 40 parts (Juz') instead of 30.

He was accused of transferring tens of hundreds of acres of prime railway land in Lahore to a Malaysian firm during General Musharraf's regime in 2001 for development of a golf course called Royal Palms Gold and Country Club. 

Railway Golf course was on lease for Rs 12 per year to an association of retired railway officers. This lease was cancelled by the Railway Executive Committee and was awarded to a Malaysian firm after a bidding process. A case was initiated against the minister and Railway executive committee for misuse of power but was cleared by Accountability court as there was no allegations of corruption.

References

External links
Profile of Senator Javed Ashraf Qazi
Roundtable with Lt. General (ret.) Javed Ashraf Qazi

 

Pakistani generals
Directors General of Inter-Services Intelligence
1941 births
Living people
People from Shimla
Federal ministers of Pakistan
Members of the Senate of Pakistan
Cadet College Hasan Abdal alumni
Pakistan Military Academy alumni
Education Ministers of Pakistan
Communications Ministers of Pakistan